The Padawan municipality is a collective name given to a subset of the Kuching District area which is not administered locally by the Kuching South City Council and the Kuching North City Hall, formerly known as Kuching Rural district. It has an area of 1771.3  km2, covering the suburbs of the Kuching Proper subdistrict and Padawan subdistrict. The area is currently administered by the local government named Padawan Municipal Council, based in Kota Padawan, located at 10th mile (16 km) from Kuching city centre.

Etymology
The origin of the name "Padawan" came from the combination of Bidayuh words namely Padja and Birawan. There is a story of a Bidayuh village elder named Kinyau stayed in an area named Sibanyai 900 years ago. One day, he discovered white beads which has mystical healing power and they called it Birawan. These beads can also bring peace, prosperity, and tranquility to the area. The village elder has an eldest son named Padja. Therefore, the village elder decided to rename the area as "Padawan" in memory of his son and the mystical beads.

Areas

Kota Padawan

Kota Padawan recreational park was completed in November 2021.

Batu Kawa

Phase 4 of Batu Kawa Riverbank park, which features children playground facilities was completed in June 2022. Phase 5 construction of the park, which includes riverbank protection was started in the same month.

Kota Sentosa
Mile 7 flyover over a traffic junction along Kuching-Serian road was opened to public in July 2022.

Matang
Kubah National Park is located within the Matang area. Matang Wildlife Centre is located within the national park.

Semenggok
Semenggoh Nature Reserve was established on 20 February 2000. It houses Sarawak Forestry Department's botanical research centre, seed bank and nursery, Semenggoh Wildlife Centre, and Sarawak Biodiversity Centre. Rajah Charles Brooke Memorial Hospital which was a former leprosy settlement during the Brooke's era, is located nearby the nature reserve.

Attractions
Padawan municipal area has nine tourist spots namely:
 Annah Rais Longhouse
 Pelaman Dunuk Longhouse
 Bunuk Longhouse
 Taman Jubilee Mas
 Pitcher Plant And Wild Orchid Garden
 Kampung Telaga Air
 Borneo Highland Resort

See also 
 Kuching

References

External links 
 Padawan Municipal Council

Populated places in Sarawak
1996 establishments in Malaysia
Kuching District